These Days is the seventeenth solo studio album by the English singer-songwriter Paul Carrack. The follow-up to Soul Shadows, it was released on 7 September 2018, on Carrack's own Carrack-UK label.

Track listing

Personnel
Musicians
 Paul Carrack – vocals, keyboards, acoustic guitar, electric guitar 
 Robbie McIntosh – acoustic guitar, electric guitar, slide guitar, dobro
 Jeremy Meek – bass 
 Steve Gadd – drums
 Frank Ricotti – percussion
 Peter Van Hooke – percussion
 Pee Wee Ellis – tenor saxophone, horn arrangements 
 Steve Beighton – baritone saxophone
 Dennis Hobson – trombone
 Gary Winters – trumpet

Production 
 Producers – Paul Carrack and Peter Van Hooke
 Engineer – Geoff Foster
 Additional engineer – Graham Bonnett
 Assistant engineer – Adam Miller
 Recorded at Air Lyndhurst (London, UK)
 Mixing – Martin Levan at Red Kite Studio (Wales, UK)
 Mastering – Ray Staff at Air Mastering (London, UK)
 Cover design – Ian Ross
 Cover concept – Ian Ross, Paul Carrack and Peter Van Hooke.
 Assorted photography – Ben Carrack, Lena Semmelroggen and Peter Van Hooke

Charts

References

2018 albums
Paul Carrack albums
Albums recorded at AIR Studios